Elna is a feminine given name. Notable people with the name include: 

 Elna Baker (born 1982), American writer and performer of humorous stories
 Elna Borch (1869–1950), Danish sculptor
 Elna Henrikson, Swedish figure skater
 Elna Jane Hilliard Grahn (1913–2006), American soldier
 Elna Kiljander (1889–1970), Finland architect
 Elna Kimmestad (1918–1997), Norwegian actress
 Elna Lassen (1901–1930), Danish ballerina
 Elna Møller (1913–1994), Danish architect
 Elna Montgomery (1885–1981), Swedish figure skater
 Elna Munch (1871–1945), Danish feminist and politician
 Elna Reinach (1968), South African former pro tennis player